Yari Mahalleh (also Romanized as Yārī Maḩalleh) is a village in Kharajgil Rural District, Asalem District, Talesh County, Gilan Province, Iran. At the 2006 census, its population was 192, in 42 families.

References 

Populated places in Talesh County